Me, Myself and Her is a 2015 comedy-drama film written and directed by Maria Sole Tognazzi and starring Margherita Buy and Sabrina Ferilli.

Plot 
Marina and Federica have been in a relationship for five years and seem to be a stable and loving couple, despite having very different personalities. Marina, a former actress, is outgoing and expressive, while Federica is reserved and private. Trouble comes to their little paradise when Marina gives an interview and when pressed about her love life mentions Federica's name and profession. Federica's co-workers find out about her orientation, which upsets Federica. Marina, on the other hand, feels that after five years Federica should be able to come out.

Stefano, a director who has always admired Marina, presses her to accept a role in his latest comedy, a role which he wrote specifically for her. Marina hasn't played a role in 15 years, but accepts this one, in part because Federica tries somewhat clumsily to make her turn it down.

Meanwhile, by chance, Federica meets Marco, an old acquaintance she hasn't seen in years. They were attracted to each other many years ago, but at that time Federica was with her now ex-husband Sergio. While Marina is filming in Milan, Federica has an affair with Marco, which is discovered by Marina via a text message. Marina follows Federica to her next rendezvous and breaks it up. Given an ultimatum by Marina, Federica at first submits to Marina's demands, but after a time finds that she cannot live this way, constantly suspected and under scrutiny. Needing time to herself to reflect on what she really wants, she moves out, first crashing at her son Bernardo's place, then setting up a small living quarters in her office, and finally moving in with Marco.

Marina, hit hard by this abandonment, is supported by her family and her ex-flame and current work assistant Camilla. Having decided that it was a mistake to accept the role, Marina goes to tell the director that she can't continue (even though this would leave him in the lurch), but is miraculously spared this difficult conversation when he tells her that the financial backers have killed the project.

After failing once more to regain her driver's license, Federica feels that she has messed everything up. At a dinner with Marco at the home of Sergio and his new family, while the two men talk with great enthusiasm of fishing, she slips out and goes to Marina's place. Marina, who feels she is finally over Federica, doesn't want to invite her in, so the two have a confrontation on the doorstep. Federica is now sure it is the relationship with Marina that she wants, but Marina, after detailing the awful way Federica has treated her, asks for six months to figure out whether she can try again.

Federica understands and accepts this, but when she leaves, Marina suddenly changes her mind and, running down several flights of stairs, tells Federica that six months is too long. The two share a passionate kiss.

Cast 

 Margherita Buy as Federica Salvini
 Sabrina Ferilli as Marina Baldi
 Fausto Maria Sciarappa as  Marco
 Alessia Barela as  Camilla
 Domenico Diele as Bernardo
 Ennio Fantastichini as  Sergio
 Massimiliano Gallo as  Stefano
 Anna Bellato as  Anna
 Antonio Zavatteri as  Carlo
 Dennis Olazo as Rolando the maid

Awards

See also 
 List of Italian films of 2015
 List of LGBT-related films directed by women

References

External links 
 
  Io e lei (Me, Myself and Her) at Lucky Red
  Me, Myself and Her at Indigo Film
  Me, Myself and Her (Io e lei) at Luce Cinecittà
  Me, Myself and Her (Io e lei) at Cineuropa
  Io e lei (Me, Myself and Her) at CinemaItaliano.info
   Io e lei (Me, Myself and Her) at Lumiere

2015 films
2015 comedy-drama films
2015 LGBT-related films
2015 romantic comedy-drama films
LGBT-related romantic comedy-drama films
Italian LGBT-related films
Italian romantic comedy-drama films
Female bisexuality in film
Lesbian-related films
Films directed by Maria Sole Tognazzi